The Samples is the eponymous debut album by The Samples. Produced by Walt Beery, the album was initially recorded and released independently, but was later released on Arista Records in May 1989, and then re- re-released in 1993 on What Are Records?.

Track listing
All songs written by Sean Kelly, except where noted.
 "Feel Us Shaking" (Kelly, Andy Sheldon, Al Laughlin, Jeep MacNichol) – 4:40
 "Waited Up" (Kelly, Laughlin) – 5:12
 "Ocean of War" – 5:01
 "Could It Be Another Change" – 3:28
 "Close to the Fires"  – 4:33
 "African Ivory" – 5:24
 "My Town" (Kelly, Laughlin) – 2:57
 "Birth of Words" – 4:41
 "After the Rain" – 3:58
 "Nature" (Kelly, Sheldon, Laughlin, MacNichol) – 5:37

Personnel
 Sean Kelly (Lead Singer, Guitars)
 Andy Sheldon (Bass, Vocals)
 Al Laughlin (Keyboards, Vocals)
 Jeep MacNichol (Drums/Percussion)
 Charles Hambleton (Guitars/Mandolin)

1989 debut albums
The Samples albums
Arista Records albums
What Are Records? albums